Schrankia dochmographa is a species of moth of the family Erebidae. It was described by David Stephen Fletcher in 1957. It is found on the Solomon Islands.

References

Moths described in 1880
Hypenodinae